Staraya Kriusha is a rural locality (a selo) and the administrative center of Starokriushanskoye Rural Settlement, Petropavlovsky District, Voronezh Oblast, Russia. The population was 2,544 as of 2010. There are 28 streets.

Geography 
Staraya Kriusha is located 37 km northeast of Petropavlovka (the district's administrative centre) by road. Novotroitskoye is the nearest rural locality.

References 

Rural localities in Petropavlovsky District, Voronezh Oblast